The women's 500 m time trial competition at the 2021 UEC European Track Championships was held on 8 October 2021.

Results

Qualifying
The top 8 riders qualified for the final.

Final

References

Women's 500 m time trial
European Track Championships – Women's 500 m time trial